National Road 11, is a Swedish national road in Skåne in southern Sweden between Malmö and Simrishamn. The length of the road is 88 km (55 mi).

Earlier the road had the road number 12, but in conjunction with the renumbering of the European routes in 1992 the Swedish National Road Administration changed the number of the national roads that would have the number in common with any European routes in Sweden, in this case E12.

References

Transport in Skåne County
National road 11